The Sheriff of Orkney and Shetland, also known as the Sheriff of Orkney and Zetland, was  historically the royal official responsible for enforcing law and order in Orkney and Shetland, Scotland. The office was combined with the role in Shetland of the "foud" and the "foudry". The foud was a bailiff who returned customs and rents due the crown, including butter and oil known as "fat goods".

The sheriffdom of Orkney and Shetland was created in the 16th century upon the ceding of the islands to Scotland for non-payment of the dowry of Margaret's marriage to King James III of Scotland by King Christian I, King of Denmark, Norway and Sweden. Prior to 1748 most sheriffdoms were held on a hereditary basis. From that date, following the Jacobite uprising of 1745, the hereditary sheriffs were replaced by salaried sheriff-deputes, qualified advocates who were members of the Scottish Bar

The position was merged in 1870 with that of the Sheriff of Caithness to create the new position of Sheriff of Caithness, Orkney & Shetland.

Sheriffs of Orkney and Shetland

Olave Sinclair (foud)
Robert Stewart (1564)
Gilbert Balfour of Westray, Sheriff of Orkney (1566).
Laurence Bruce (1571)
John Dishington (1581-1610)
Lt-Col. Patrick Blair 1663, 1669–1672
Sheriffs-Depute
Robert Craigie, 1786–1791  (Sheriff of Dumfries, 1791–1811)
Charles Hope, 1792–1801 
William Rae, 1801–1809  (Sheriff of Edinburgh, 1809)
William Erskine, 1809–?1822 (died 1822)
James Allan Maconochie, 1822–?1845 (died 1845)
Charles Neaves, 1845–1852 
William Edmondstoune Aytoun, 1852–1865
Adam Gifford, 1865–1870

 For sheriffs after 1870 see Sheriff of Caithness, Orkney and Shetland

See also
 Historical development of Scottish sheriffdoms

References

Orkney
Sheriff